Karlson is a patronymic surname meaning "son of Karl".  There are other spelling variations.

People with surname Karlson or Karlsons
 Christian Thomsen Carl, also referred to as Karlson (1676–1713), Danish navy officer
 Ģirts Karlsons (born 1981), Latvian football player
 , German chemist, 1974 Feldberg Foundation prize recipient
 Phil Karlson (1908–1982), American film noir director

See also
 Carlsen (disambiguation)
 Carlson (disambiguation)
 Carlsson (disambiguation)
 Karlsson (disambiguation)
Karlson creek, California
Jacob Karlzon
Ģirts Karlsons

Patronymic surnames
Surnames from given names